Empress Xiaojiesu (1508–1528), of the Chen clan, was a Chinese empress consort of the Ming dynasty, first empress to the Jiajing Emperor.

She was the daughter of Chen Wanyang (d. 1535). She was selected in to the palace of the Jiajing Emperor in 1522. Later that year, she was appointed empress upon the wish of the emperor's aunt, the Empress Dowager Zhang. Because of the tense personal relationship between the Emperor and his aunt, however, he did not take a liking to Chen. In 1528, she became pregnant. During the pregnancy, the Emperor exposed her to a fit of rage, which caused a fatal miscarriage.

The Emperor did not permit her to be buried in the imperial mausoleum: this was not done before 1567.

Titles 
During the reign of the Zhengde Emperor (r. 1505–1521)
Lady Chen (陳氏; from 1508)
During the reign of the Jiajing Emperor (r. 1521–1567)
Empress (皇后; from September 1521)
Empress Daoling (悼靈皇后, from October 1528)
Empress Xiaojie (孝潔皇后; from 1536)
During the reign of the Longqing Emperor (r. 1567– 1572)
Empress Xiaojie Gongyi Cirui Anzhuang Xiangtian Yisheng Su (孝潔恭懿慈睿安莊相天翊聖肅皇后; from 1567)

Issue 
As empress:
Miscarriage (1528)

Notes

References

1508 births
1528 deaths
Ming dynasty empresses
16th-century Chinese women
16th-century Chinese people
Deaths in childbirth
People from Handan
People from Daming County